Peacemakers is an American crime fiction television series about forensic science in the Old West. It was filmed in Vancouver in British Columbia, Canada. The series premiered July 30, 2003, on the USA Network. The show was cancelled after one season of nine episodes.

Plot
Peacemakers depicts law enforcement efforts in Silver City, Colorado, during the waning years of the American Old West. Deputy United States Marshal Jared Stone (Tom Berenger) and his colleague, private detective Larimer Finch (Peter O'Meara), are the primary law officers. Katie Owen (Amy Carlson), the town's undertaker and mortician, assists them as a forensic pathologist.  Silver City is a silver boom town embracing new technologies, including a telephone exchange with long-distance service to Denver, and electric lighting.

Stone is a decorated soldier of the American Civil War, a former gunfighter, expert tactician and marksman.  His jurisdiction covers a larger region centered on Silver City. Finch is an experienced criminologist and trained forensic scientist, a graduate of Yale University who completed post-graduate work at Cambridge University and interned with Scotland Yard.  He was formerly an operative of the Pinkerton Detective Agency, speaks fluent Chinese, and is skilled with hand-to-hand combat.

Finch came to Silver City to investigate a murder committed in a private railway car at the Silver City rail depot. To avoid reassignment to a strike breaking detail, he resigned from the agency and remained in Silver City, where he uses his knowledge of fingerprinting, ballistics, photography, chemistry and scientific analysis to aid Marshal Stone in his investigations. Owen, a former medical student, was forced to take over the family mortuary business after the accidental deaths of her parents. Her medical skills make her a valuable ally and friend to Stone and Finch.

Cast

Main cast
 Tom Berenger as Marshal Jared Stone
 Peter O'Meara as Detective Larimer Finch
 Amy Carlson as Katie Owen
 Colby Johannson as Chipper Dunn
 Bellamy Young as Twyla Gentry
 Bob Gunton as Mayor Smith
 Barbara Tyson as Luci Prescott
 Jim Shield as Jake Freeman
 Anthony Ulc as Vic Simmons
 Matthew Bennett as Steward Harrison
 Greg Cipes as Will Johnston

Notable guest stars
 James Remar as Cole Hawkins
 Duncan Fraser as CW Wentworth
 Gabrielle Rose as Kathryn Wentworth
 Jonathan Scarfe as Dean Wilder
 Neil Maffin as Christopher Hamilton
 Anthony Harrison as Officer Hardy
 Marcus Hondro as Babbles
 Dahlia Salem as Sabrina Hamilton
 Damon Johnson as Pete
 Steven Rudy as Telegraph Operator
 Colton Schock as Frank
Greg Anderson as Mr. Chastain
 Julie Benz as Miranda Blanchard

Episodes

Awards
 Nominated for a 2004 Canadian Society of Cinematographers Award for "Best Cinematography in TV Drama".
 Won the 2004 "Bronze Wrangler" Western Heritage Award for "Outstanding Factual or Fictional Drama".

See also
Hec Ramsey

References

External links
 

2000s American crime television series
2000s Western (genre) television series
2003 American television series debuts
2003 American television series endings
USA Network original programming
United States Marshals Service in fiction
Television shows filmed in Vancouver